When I'm Alone is the debut album by American singer-songwriter Girlpuppy. The album was released on October 28, 2022 via Royal Mountain Records.

Singles 
When I'm Alone was announced on July 19, 2022 alongside the release of lead single, "Wish", which was accompanied by a music video directed by Matt Swinsky and Eat Humans. The second single, "I Want to Be There", was released on August 10, 2022. The third single, "Destroyer", was released on September 6, 2022 along with a music video directed by Matt Swinsky, and the forth single, "Teenage Dream", was released on October 5, 2022.

Influences 
Girlpuppy was influenced by The Twilight Saga: New Moon soundtrack while making the album along with the novel Daisy Jones and The Six. Her friends and family were also an influence as her best friend is referenced in the song "Emma Marie" and her brother is referenced in the songs "Denver" and "I Want to Be There". Becca Harvey also cited the band Grizzly Bear, specifically the song "On a Neck, On a Spit", as an influence of the album as well.

Track listing

Personnel  

 Becca Harvey - vocals, tambourine, claps
 Samuel Acchione - production, background vocals, harmonies, acoustic guitar, electric guitar, twelve-string guitar, slide guitar, bass, loop drums, drums, cabasa, claves, Wurlitzer, keys, tambourine, shaker
 John Michael Young - acoustic guitar, electric guitar, twelve-string guitar, mandolin, bass, drums, keys, bells, glockenspiel, shaker
 Tom Sinclair - bass, Wurlitzer, piano, shaker 
 Henry Stoehr - recording, engineering, mixing, harmonies, background vocals, keys, claps
 Tom Kelly - recording and engineering on "Destroyer", "When I'm Alone" and "Revenant", drums
 Blaise O'Brien - piano
 Molly Germer - violin, string arrangements 
 Brandon McClain - photography 
 Em Davenport - album artwork, layout 
 Lucas Reif - typography, layout 
 Damon Moon - recording and engineering "Teenage Dream"
 Dan Millice - mastering 
 Kieran Ferris - recording and engineering on "Teenage Dream", "Destroyer", "When I'm Alone" and "Revenant"

References

2022 debut albums
Indie rock albums by American artists